Whitefield Theological Seminary is an unaccredited distance education Reformed theological seminary in Lakeland, Florida, United States.  A conservative confessional institution, it teaches from the Reformed perspective of Protestant Christianity. The seminary holds to the Westminster Standards which includes the Confession of 1647, Larger and Shorter Catechism. Courses of study are offered on-site at the seminary's Lakeland offices but primarily through distance learning.

The seminary is affiliated with the Association of Reformed Theological Seminaries. Its website states that "all degree programs are designed for use in conjunction with church-related ministries". The school derives its name from 18th-century revivalist George Whitefield. Founder and first president Kenneth Gary Talbot died on August 18, 2022. Mr. Jason L. Bradfield, M.A., has served as interim president since September 5, 2022.

Notable alumni

 Gary DeMar
 Kenneth Gentry
 George Grant
 Francis Nigel Lee
 Keith Mathison
 R. C. Sproul, Sr.
 Thomas Schirrmacher
 Stephen Mansfield

References

External links
Whitefield Theological Seminary

Seminaries and theological colleges in Florida
Reformed church seminaries and theological colleges
Universities and colleges in Lakeland, Florida
Educational institutions established in 1980
1980 establishments in Florida